This is a list of electoral results for the electoral district of Barambah in Queensland state elections.

Members for Barambah

Election results

Elections in the 1990s
The election results for the 1998 election were:

Elections in the 1980s

Elections in the 1970s

Elections in the 1960s

Elections in the 1950s

References

Queensland state electoral results by district